Marcellina is a  (municipality) in the Metropolitan City of Rome in the Italian region of Latium, located about  northeast of Rome.

Origins of the name
According to an uncorroborated hypothesis, the town takes the name of the Roman gens of the Claudii Marcelli, owners of lands in Marcellina during the Middle Ages. More substantial is the derivation from the surname of the feudal family of Marcellina, the Marcellini, or de Marcellinis.

References

Cities and towns in Lazio